Plymouth Citybus is a bus operator in Plymouth. It is a subsidiary of the Go South West sector of the Go-Ahead Group.

History

Plymouth City Transport

In 1892, Plymouth Corporation purchased the horse-powered tramways of the Plymouth Tramway Company and placed them in the care of a new Tramways Department. The network was expanded and the horses were replaced by new electric tramcars between 1899 and 1906. Following the union of the Three Towns of Plymouth, Devonport and Stonehouse in October 1914, the Plymouth Tramways Department took control of the tramways in these places too. The Devonport and District Tramways was sold to the Corporation in 1914 (although the tracks of the two networks were not connected until October 1915) but the Plymouth, Stonehouse and Devonport Tramways, which dated back to 1872, remained an independent company until 1922 when it too was sold to the Corporation. The various depots of the old companies were slowly closed and the equipment and rolling stock concentrated at the old Devonport and District depot at Milehouse. Some new tramcars were constructed at the depot, and many more were completely stripped down and rebuilt. In 1923 new administrative offices were built there; that year saw the tram network at its greatest extent.

From 1920, the Corporation also operated motor buses on routes beyond the tram tracks. The first four bus routes were operated by a fleet of twenty single-deck 31-seat vehicles with solid tyres. By 1927 this had expanded to ten routes and 57 buses, some of which were one-man operated. Plymouth was granted city status in 1928 and the buses started to carry the city's coat of arms and the "Plymouth City Transport" name.

By 1930, it was becoming necessary to renew much of the tramway rolling stock. Consideration was given to converting to trolleybuses, but instead it was decided to implement a ten-year programme of bus replacement. The first line to be converted was the Devonport to St Budeaux line which was closed in October 1930 when six new double-deck buses replaced the trams. The line to West Hoe closed in 1931, the line to Compton closed in 1932, and regular services to the Royal Naval Barracks withdrawn in 1934. Further new buses were brought for these routes, and a few second hand tramcars from the now closed Exeter Tramway Company and Torquay Tramways allowed the oldest of the Plymouth cars to be withdrawn. In 1935 the Milehouse to Devonport line closed following the delivery of the city's first diesel-engined buses. More were needed in 1936 to allow the closure of the line to Prince Rock and in 1937 to allow the withdrawal of the two long circular routes. It was at this time that the bus routes were first numbered. The plan to close the remaining tram lines was put on hold because of the outbreak of World War II in 1939; they were powered by electricity generated by British coal, whereas the buses relied on imported fuel. The one remaining route, from Theatre to Peverell, kept running but following city centre bomb damage in April 1941 (when car 133 was destroyed) the service was only operated between Drake's Circus to Peverell until the final tram ran in September 1945.

A large part of the population of Plymouth moved out to the relative safety of the countryside during the war which meant that the Corporation's buses and trams were carrying fewer passengers, but rival Western National was under increasing pressure. Both operators had suffered damage to their depots and fleet – Milehouse was bombed in April 1941 – and so the two companies decided to pool resources under a Plymouth Joint Services agreement. This took effect from 1 October 1942 and resulted in 80% of mileage in and around the city were to be operated by the Corporation and 20% by Western National; the receipts were also divided in the same proportion, irrespective of which company operated which routes. This allowed Plymouth buses to operate beyond the city boundary to places such as Yelverton, Plympton and Wembury, while Western National were now allowed to pick up local passengers within the city where they had previously been restricted to only those travelling beyond the boundary. The Plymouth Joint Services agreement remained in place after the war, enabling both the Corporation and Western National to serve new housing estates that sprang up around the edge of the city. The routes in the Joint Services area, including those of Western National, were renumbered in a single sequence from 1 to 57 in 1957.

Buses with front entrances were delivered to Plymouth City Transport from 1960 which paved the way to conversion of routes to one man operation from 1968, the first operator in the South West of England to do so. To help speed boarding times the fares were restructured to multiples of 3d. Fare stages at regular  intervals were introduced in December 1975 to further simplify the fare structure. In 1982 the fare stages were revised to one-mile intervals outside the city centre and promoted as 'Easyfare'; a journey in one zone cost 25p and increased in 10p stages to a maximum of 45p.

Plymouth Citybus

During the early part of the 1980s, the National Bus Company (of which Western National was a subsidiary) undertook Market Analysis Projects in many areas to match services with demand. This resulted in most Plymouth Joint Services cross-city routes being split into two that terminated in the city centre from 24 October 1982, as the survey revealed that few passengers travelled across the city without changing buses. The revision saw annual mileage reduced from more than 5.4 million miles to around 4.5 million, and the fleet from 185 to 160 vehicles. Buses were repainted and given "Plymouth Citybus" branding.

For some time, the Citybus services had been operated to break even so that no financial support was needed from the Plymouth City Council, but the Transport Act 1985 required all council-owned bus operations to be established as limited companies. As a result, Plymouth Citybus Limited was formed on 26 October 1986. It was owned by Plymouth City Council. The Transport Act was designed to increase competition and reduce subsidies; in Plymouth it resulted in a 'bus war' between Plymouth Citybus and Western National, its former partner in the Joint Services. Strategies included minibuses operating higher frequencies, and fare reductions.

On 21 January 1988, Citybus sacked 120 drivers who had stopped work to attend a mass meeting. Their colleagues walked out in solidarity and the Citybus service was crippled for two weeks. Western National used this opportunity to lay on extra buses, using the same numbers as Citybus services they were replacing, and Western National also covered Citybus school and Dockyard routes. Western National threatened to give jobs to sacked Citybus drivers. The Plymouth Evening Herald reported daily on the war of words between Citybus Director Brian Fisher (formerly Principal Assistant Transport Manager for Plymouth City Transport) and Western National Director John Preece. Agreement between Citybus management and unions was reached on 5 February, with drivers returning to work on 6 February.

After a while direct competition between the two companies ceased and they largely returned to operating their old routes. At the end of the century Citybus operated about 75% of routes in Plymouth along with a few routes beyond the city boundaries.

Go-Ahead Group
In May 2009, Plymouth City Council announced that it intended to sell the company. Early interest came from FirstGroup and local taxi owner John Preece who had been behind the privatisation of Western National and had made previous attempts to purchase Citybus. The proposed sale led to increased competition in the city but FirstGroup withdrew its interest. It was debated in the House of Commons in October 2009. A £20 million bid by the Go-Ahead Group was accepted in November 2009.

Operations

As of October 2013, Plymouth Citybus employed 443 people, operated 151 buses and coaches, and carried about 14 million passengers annually. In addition to its bus and coach operations, it also provides vehicle repairs and servicing for other commercial road operators and private car drivers through its Car and Commercial division. Its fleet is based at a depot in Milehouse.

In October 2013, Plymouth Citybus launched a new service to Tavistock. This has since been withdrawn leaving Tavistock-Plymouth services in the hands of Stagecoach South West.

Plymouth Citycoach
Plymouth City Transport's first coach-seated vehicles was a Leyland National fitted with coach seats. Plymouth Citycoach was created as a separate unit within Citybus with its own management and a remit to produce a profit. It offered both advertised day trips and holiday tours, as well as hiring out its vehicles. They carry a version of the bus livery, but generally with more white.

Go Cornwall Bus
The Liskeard-based operations of Western Greyhound were purchased on 8 December 2014 with 9 Optare Solo buses and relaunched as Go Cornwall Bus. This included the Liskeard-Plymouth section of route 593 but the Liskeard-Newquay section of the same route remained with Western Greyhound and through tickets were made available.

It was announced on 6 January 2020 that Cornwall Council had awarded the entire tendered county bus network (except the Truro Park & Ride) to the Go-Ahead Group from 1 April. It will be operated under Go Cornwall Bus brand. The contract consists of 73 routes and will require approximately 130 vehicles. FirstGroup subsidiary Kernow retained the Truro Park & Ride contract and will continue to run their commercially-operated routes.

The Flash

In more recent years, Citybus launched a range of services known as the Flash, with the colour of the livery preceding Flash, with Red, Blue, Green, Yellow and Orange. The RedFlash being the 21/A service between Barne Barton and Chaddlewood, BlueFlash being a number of services in the city of Plymouth, such as the 42/A/B/C between the City Centre and Woolwell, Derriford Hospital and Tamerton Foliot, as well as the 11 between Plymouth and Bodmin, in Cornwall. GreenFlash was the name given to the commuter services 8/9 and 23/24 between the City Centre and Efford and Mount Gould, as well as the 5/A/B/C serving Plymstock. YellowFlash buses were commonly Volvo B7TLs running the 50/A/51 services that loop around the City in clockwise and anticlockwise directions, serving the City Centre, Plymouth railway station, Camels Head, Derriford Hospital, Estover and Marsh Mills. Finally the most recent addition, the OrangeFlash, was the service 43 between the City Centre and Ernesettle, with the buses running the route being MAN EcoCity Gas Buses.

'Flash' branding has now been withdrawn in favour of the default Plymouth Citybus brand.

Fleet

The first buses delivered in 1920 were twenty 31-seat Straker-Squire vehicles with solid tyres.

By 1927 the fleet included Burford, Shelvoke and Drewry, Guy and AEC models and totalled 57 buses; The tram replacement scheme of 1930 saw the introduction of double-deck buses, initially Leyland TD1s. by 1929 it had expanded to 83. As well as more Leylands, some Dennis Lancet buses were brought for later route conversions. In 1935 the city's first diesel-engined double-deck buses were delivered (more Leylands); some as tram replacements and others so that older single-deck buses could be replaced. During the war a mixture of buses were acquired as few new buses were being built. Further Leyland Titan PD1 buses were delivered once production resumed after the war, but the spread of suburbs onto the hilly hinterland saw more powerful Leyland PD2s entering service from 1948.

Leyland Atlanteans were introduced from 1960. These had rear-engines and front entrances which eventually paved the way to conversion to one man operation from 1968. Single-deck buses reappeared in the fleet in 1975 in the shape of Leyland Nationals. In October 1986 85 Renault/Dodge S56A minibuses was introduced, which represented 70% of the Citybus fleet at the time. These allowed narrow housing estate roads to be served and service frequencies to be increased on existing routes. They were replaced by Mercedes-Benz 709D minibuses. Mid-size single deck buses replaced most double-deck vehicles on busier routes to give high service frequencies, principally Dennis Darts.

Preservation
A number of Plymouth City Transport and Plymouth Citybus vehicles have been preserved by members of the Plymouth City Transport Preservation Group.

Liveries and brands

Plymouth City Tramways initially used a maroon colour scheme but a yellow and white livery was introduced in 1922 although some had varnished teak bodies. A change to maroon and white was made in 1929. Buses later used a bright red and cream livery.

A new image (designed by Ososki Graphics of Exmouth) was introduced to coincide with the revised Plymouth Joint Services network in 1982. Plymouth's red and cream colours were retained, but the cream area was extended below the lower deck windows and also added around the upper deck windows; the red skirt was upswept at the rear. The new 'Plymouth City bus' logo was placed on the cream below the windows near the centre of each side; 'city' was red and the other words black. Western National buses used on Plymouth Joint Services carried the same 'Plymouth City bus' logos on a broad white panel around the lower deck on their otherwise green buses. Six Bristol LHs that operated beyond the city boundaries were given a matching 'Country bus' logo, and a Leyland National with a wheelchair lift was branded as 'Mobility bus'. The Minibuses introduced in 1986 were painted in cream with red and orange bands and branded 'City shuttle'.

A few years later a black, red and white livery was adopted for all buses, but the black was eventually replaced by grey. When low floor buses were introduced they were given 'Super Rider' branding. Park and ride services were introduced using Mercedes-Benz minibuses in a mid-grey scheme but the Dennis Dart MPDs that replaced them were given special green and yellow livery.

The red, white and grey livery later became red and white. Following the takeover by Go Ahead in 2009, Best Impressions designed a two tone red livery with a white 'swoosh', this accompanied a new version of the Plymouth CityBus logo. However this has since been adapted by the company, who now use a plain red with a different style of swoosh (which covers more of the bus) and a simplified version of the Best Impressions devised logo.

References

External links
 
 Company website

Bus operators in Cornwall
Bus operators in Devon
Companies based in Plymouth, Devon
Go-Ahead Group companies
Transport in Plymouth, Devon
1892 establishments in England
British companies established in 1892
Transport companies established in 1892